Persis Princess Namuganza (born 5 October 1984) is a Ugandan politician and the State Minister for Lands, Housing and Urban Development (Lands) in the Cabinet of Uganda. She was appointed to that position on 6 June 2016. Namuganza concurrently serves as the elected representative of Bukono County in Namutumba District, in the 11th Parliament (2021–2026).

Background and education
She was born in Namutumba District on 5 October 1984 in an Anglican family. After attending local schools for her primary education, she studied at Mount Elgon High School in Mbale, for her Uganda Certificate of Education which she completed in 1999 . She then went to a school in Luweero District, where she sat for her Uganda Advanced Certificate of Education in 2003. In 2006, Namuganza was awarded a diploma in Accounting by the Makerere Business Institute (not affiliated with Makerere University). That same year, she entered Kyambogo University, graduating in 2009 with a Bachelor of Social Work and Social Administration degree. And in April 2014, she graduated from Cavendish University Uganda with a master's in international relations.

Career before politics
She began her career in 2009 at Anti-Corruption Coalition Uganda, a non-governmental organization (NGO), where she served as a Programme officer from 2009 to 2010. She was transferred to Pearl of Africa Research and Accountability, another NGO, serving as a public relations officer and administrator from 2010 to 2012. She served as the chairperson Busoga Youth Forum from 2010 to 2011. She was appointed as a deputy Resident District Commissioner (RDC) for Luweero District, serving in that capacity from 2012 to 2015.

Political career
In 2016, she entered competitive elective national politics by contesting the Bukono County Constituency seat in Namutumba District on the National Resistance Movement political party platform. She won and is the incumbent.

Her other contributions 
She bought a tractor; "Twabire Community Tractor 2018" for Bukono County. She bought coffee seedlings for the youth. She distributed scholastic materials to some schools, including Twivula Secondary School. She fundraised USh7 Million towards building the Arch-Deaconry House. She provided half and full bursaries to secondary school and university students. She built a ventilated improved pit (VIP) latrine for Kikalu Primary School. She purchased onion seeds for the people of Ivukula, On 17 January 2019 she donated to Kibaale Namutumba Farmers' SACCO, 2 million Uganda Shillings.

Hobbies and special interests 
Persis Princess Namuganza is a huge fan of Political Debates, Touring, Travelling, Swimming, Listening to Gospel Music, Watching Movies, Watching Football. And her special interests include participation in the general cleaning of the environment, Community Sensitization on particular issues like security, health, hygiene etc.

Controversies
In March 2018, 32 members of the Busoga parliamentary caucus met and voted to expel Persis Namuganza, from the caucus, for "unbecoming conduct". The caucus accuses Namuganza of threatening as well as inciting her voters to cause harm, injure and maim the Kyabazinga William Gabula Nadiope IV and Speaker Rebecca Kadaga at a rally she held at Ivukula in Namutumba District, during the first half of March 2018.

On Monday 12 March 2018, the Daily Monitor reported that the Inspector General of Government, Irene Mulyagonja was investigating Namugaza, for possible lack of the necessary academic qualifications to hold the public offices that she currently occupies. The investigation was initiated, following a formal complainant, filed on 7 March 2018, by a group of "concerned people" from Busoga, her home sub-region.

Namuganza was censured by the Parliament of Uganda on 23 January 2023 as a result of alleged misconduct. 348 MPs voted for her to be censured, 5 MPs were against the censure motion.

See also 
 Busoga
 Cabinet of Uganda
 Member of Parliament 
 List of members of the eleventh Parliament of Uganda
 Richard Gafabusa 
 Parliament of Uganda
 Member of Parliament

References

External links
 Website of the Uganda Ministry of Lands, Housing & Urban Development
Profile: Meet Minister Persis Namuganza; Kadaga’s terrifying nemesis
Website of the Parliament of Uganda

1984 births
People from Namutumba District
21st-century Ugandan women politicians
21st-century Ugandan politicians
Independent politicians in Uganda
Government ministers of Uganda
People from Eastern Region, Uganda
Kyambogo University alumni
Cavendish University Uganda alumni
Women government ministers of Uganda
Women members of the Parliament of Uganda
Members of the Parliament of Uganda
National Resistance Movement politicians
Living people